The Women's freestyle 55 kg is a competition featured at the 2017 European Wrestling Championships and was held in Novi Sad in Serbia on May 4.

Medalists

Results
Legend
F — Won by fall

Top half

Repechage

References
Draw
Results

Women's freestyle 55 kg